QSS may refer to:

 Quantum Secret Sharing, a quantum cryptographic scheme for secure communication
 Queensway Secondary School, a co-educational government secondary school in Queenstown, Singapore
 QSS, the station code for Qila Sattar Shah railway station, Sheikhupura District, Pakistan